Allylglycine is a glycine derivative. It is an inhibitor of glutamate decarboxylase. Inhibition of glutamate decarboxylase blocks GABA biosynthesis, leading to lower levels of the neurotransmitter. Allylglycine is known to induce seizures in animals studies, presumably due to this GDC-inhibiting activity.

See also
3-Mercaptopropionic acid

References

Amino acids
Convulsants
Glutamate decarboxylase inhibitors
Enzyme inhibitors
Allyl compounds